Max Erich (Eric) Reissner (January 5, 1913 – November 1, 1996) was a German-American civil engineer and mathematician, and Professor of Mathematics at the Massachusetts Institute of Technology. He was recipient of the Theodore von Karman Medal in 1964, and the ASME Medal in 1988

Reissner is known as co-developer of the Mindlin–Reissner plate theory. He is remembered by The New York Times (1996) as the "mathematician whose work in applied mechanics helped broaden the theoretical understanding of how solid objects react under stress and led to advances in both civil and aerospace engineering."

Professor Reissner is perhaps best known for the Reissner shear deformation plate theory, which resolved the classical boundary-condition paradox of Kirchhoff, and for establishment of the Reissner variational principle in solid mechanics, for which he received an award from the American Institute of Aeronautics and Astronautics. Professor Reissner also has been honored by the American Society of Civil Engineers with the Theodore von Kármán Medal, by the American Society of Mechanical Engineers with the Timoshenko Medal, and by the University of Hanover, Germany, with an honorary doctorate. He was elected a fellow of the American Academy of Arts and Sciences and the American Institute of Aeronautics and Astronautics, a member of the National Academy of Engineering and the International Academy of Astronautics, and an honorary member of the American Society of Mechanical Engineers and the German Society for Applied Mathematics and Mechanics (Gesellschaft für Angewandte Mathematik und Mechanik). He wrote nearly 300 articles published in scientific and technical journals and continued these contributions to the advancement of knowledge until the last few months of his illness.

Biography 

Reissner was born in Aachen, Germany, son of Hans Jacob Reissner, an aeronautical engineer, and Josefine (Reichenberger) Reissner. At the Technical University of Berlin he obtained his Bsc in Applied Mathematics in 1935, and his MSc in Civil Engineering in 1936. Next he obtained his PhD at the Massachusetts Institute of Technology in 1938 under Dirk Struik with the thesis, entitled "Contributions to the Theory of Elasticity of Non-Isotropic Materials."

Reissner started his academic career in 1938 at the Massachusetts Institute of Technology, where he taught mathematics. In 1947 he was appointed Professor of Mathematics, and served in this position until 1969. Next from 1969 to 1979 he was Professor of Applied Mechanics and Engineering Sciences at the University of California, San Diego. From 1948 to 1955 he had also been researcher at NASA's Langley Research Center, and from 1956 to 1957 at Lockheed's Palo Alto Research Center.

Reissner was awarded a Guggenheim Fellowship in 1962. He was awarded the honorary doctor by the University of Hanover, and was elected honorary member by the Society for Applied Mathematics and Mechanics (GAMM). He received the Timoshenko Medal in 1973, the Theodore von Karman Medal in 1964, and of the ASME Medal in 1988.

Selected publications 
 William Ted Martin and Eric Reissner. Elementary differential equations. Addison-Wesley Publishing Company, 1956; 1961.
 Eric Reissner. Selected Works in Applied Mechanics and Mathematics. 1996.

Articles, a selection
 E. Reissner, "The Effect of Transverse Shear Deformation on the Bending of Elastic Plates," ASME Journal of Applied Mechanics, Vol. 12, 1945, pp. A68–A77
 Reissner, Eric. "On bending of elastic plates." Quarterly of Applied Mathematics 5.1 (1947): 55–68.
 Reissner, Eric. "On a variational theorem in elasticity." Studies in Applied Mathematics 29.1–4 (1950): 90–95.
 Lin C. C., Reissner E., Tsien H. S. ″On two-dimensional non steady motion of a slender body in a compressible fluid″ // J. Math. and Phus. 1948. V. 27, No 3

References

External links 
 Eric Reissner, Memorial Tributes: National Academy of Engineering

1913 births
1996 deaths
American civil engineers
20th-century American mathematicians
German emigrants to the United States
Technical University of Berlin alumni
Massachusetts Institute of Technology alumni
Massachusetts Institute of Technology School of Science faculty
University of California, San Diego faculty
Engineers from Aachen
ASME Medal recipients
Textbook writers
Engineers from California
20th-century American engineers